The D-Click System is a navigation control system developed by iriver for some of their portable media players. D-Click features physical buttons that are under a device's screen and hence not visible, thus it involves "clicking" the screen. Effectively, it makes the screen act as a 4-way directional control pad D-Click is used by users on these devices to find music, videos, photos or play games.

The D-Click System is patented by iriver.

Models with D-Click
iriver U10
iriver clix
iriver B20
iriver S10
iriver S7
iriver clix (2nd generation)
iriver Lplayer
iriver E100
iriver E50

References

IRiver